Robin West (born 1954) is the Frederick J. Haas Professor of Law and Philosophy emerita at the Georgetown University Law Center.  West's research is primarily concerned with feminist legal theory, constitutional law and theory, philosophy of law, and the law and literature movement.

West holds a B.A. and a J.D. (1979) from the University of Maryland and a masters in judicial studies from Stanford. West came to Georgetown after teaching at the University of Maryland Law School from 1986 to 1991, and at the Cleveland-Marshall College of Law from 1982 to 1985.

West is best known for her work in the ethics of care and feminist legal theory.  West has argued that the liberal view of people as autonomous individuals is only superficially true from a masculine perspective in her most famous work, "Jurisprudence and Gender." She has also published extensively on the concept of consent in sexual, legal, and institutional contexts.

Selected works

Books

Journal articles 
 
See also:

See also
Robin West's contributions to the Law and Literature movement

References

External links
Faculty page at Georgetown Law

1954 births
Living people
American legal scholars
Cleveland State University faculty
Georgetown University Law Center faculty
Stanford University alumni
University of Maryland, College Park faculty
University of Maryland, College Park alumni
University of Maryland, Baltimore alumni